Ralph Skinner was a sixteenth century Clergyman and member of parliament.

Skinner was  educated at Winchester and New College, Oxford. Successively he sat as an MP for Leicester, Penryn, Bossiney and Westbury. As well as his representative duties he was Lay rector  of Broughton Astley from  1550 to 1553; Pro-warden of New College, Oxford, from 1551 to 1553; Warden of Sherburn Hospital  from 1559; Commissioner  to enforce Acts of Uniformity and Supremacy for the Province of York from 1560; Chancellor, Receiver General and Dean of the Palatinate of Durham from 1561; and Rector of Sedgefield (where he was buried) from 1562.

References

16th-century births
1563 deaths
People educated at Winchester College
Alumni of New College, Oxford
Wardens of New College, Oxford
Deans of Durham
Year of birth unknown
English MPs 1547–1552
English MPs 1553 (Mary I)
English MPs 1555
English MPs 1559
Members of the pre-1707 English Parliament for constituencies in Cornwall
Members of the Parliament of England for constituencies in Wiltshire